Fatimah binte Abdul Lateef (Jawi: فاطمه بنت عبداللتايف; born 16 March 1966) is a Singaporean former politician. A member of the governing People's Action Party (PAP), she was the Member of Parliament (MP) representing the Geylang Serai ward of Marine Parade GRC between 2006 and 2020.

Education
Fatimah had her early education at CHIJ Opera Estate (now CHIJ (Katong) Primary), CHIJ Katong and Temasek Junior College. She then went on the National University of Singapore, where she completed her Bachelor of Medicine and Bachelor of Surgery (MBBS) at the Faculty of Medicine. She subsequently obtained an FRCS (A&E) from the Royal Infirmary of Edinburgh as well as sub-specialisations in Emergency Cardiovascular and Neurovascular care and Prehospital care Medicine from the Medical College of Virginia and the University of Cincinnati.

Career
Fatimah is currently a senior consultant in the Department of Emergency Medicine at Singapore General Hospital.

Political career
Fatimah was first elected to parliament at the 2006 general election as an MP for Marine Parade GRC. She had been representing the ward of Geylang Serai until 2020, where she was replaced by her successor, Mohd Fahmi Aliman.

References

External links

1966 births
Living people
Members of the Parliament of Singapore
National University of Singapore alumni
People's Action Party politicians
Singaporean women in politics
Singaporean Muslims
Singaporean people of Malay descent
21st-century Singaporean politicians